Staten Island Academy is a coeducational, college-preparatory day school located on a  campus in Staten Island, New York City, United States. Founded in 1884 by Anton Methfessel, it is the oldest independent school on Staten Island, and is the only independent school (non-public, non-religious) in the borough. It educates students from Pre-Kindergarten through Grade 12. The current enrollment is around 390 students, with a student to teacher ratio of 7:1. Eileen Corigliano is the current head of school. The school is composed of three divisions: Lower School, Pre-K-Gr. 4; Middle School, Gr. 5-8; Upper School, Gr. 9-12. The Head of Lower, Middle and Upper School is Eileen Corigliano. The campus has seven buildings: the Early Childhood Building, the Art Barn, Haugen Hall, Kearns Hall, Crowe Hall, Alumni Hall and the OJ Buck Gymnasium. The school's accreditations include the Middle States Association of Colleges and Schools, and the New York State Association of Independent Schools. It is chartered and registered by the Board of Regents, University of the State of New York.

History

Founding and early years
The Academy was formally chartered on September 5, 1884 by Anton Methfessel and prominent educators that helped merge the Methfessel Institute, which was founded in 1862, with the original Staten Island Academy and Latin School. It rapidly expanded, dropped the phrase “Latin School” from its name, and gained prominence with a curriculum that was progressive for its day. In 1885, required courses for the Intermediate Form (grades 9-12) included Latin, German, French, English, geography, physiology, zoology, mathematics, history, natural philosophy, expression, music, and drawing. The Academic Form required more advanced study, and The Latin School division mandated, additionally, student literacy in both Latin and Greek.

Many prominent professionals in theater, education, literature, politics and business were associated with the Academy throughout this period including actor Sidney Wollett, North Pole explorer Admiral Perry, Booker T. Washington, the Vanderbilt family, Jacob Riis, and George William Curtis, a member of the Academy's Board of Trustees and the namesake for Curtis High School.

In 1891 the school bought land at the corner of Wall Street and Academy Place, a street that was named after the school, in the St. George section of Staten Island. Because of the expanding student population, a grand new building of English architectural design was built, and the cornerstone was laid in December 1895.  The new building was dedicated at commencement in June 1896. The historic cornerstone now stands outside Alumni Hall on the school's Todt Hill campus, while the original building is now the Staten Island Museum.

Early 20th century

Around the start of the 20th century, the Academy explored and adopted "new" educational pedagogies, including those espoused by John Dewey and Friedrich Fröbel, the creator of the Kindergarten.

Athletics gained prominence as interest in facilitating a connection between physical education and intellectual growth emerged, and the Academy expanded its athletics offerings. Teams during the early part of the 1900s included football, ice hockey (played at Silver Lake), track and cross-country running, basketball, baseball, tennis, and shell-racing. The growing program forced Academy athletes in 1921 to hold their contests at fields that had been given to the school on Delafield Square. In 1931, a field house and additional athletic fields were acquired when the school purchased land off Todt Hill Road, and Staten Island Academy donated the land at Delafield Square to the City of New York, which created Walker Park from it.

During this time, William Winter, a critic and patron of the arts, established the Winter Memorial Library at the school in honor of his son Arthur, an Academy student who had died while he was enrolled at the school. Through Mr. Winter's influence, the collection of the library, which was modeled after Sir Walter Scott's, included autographed portraits of Dickens, Gladstone, and Disraeli. Its shelves held first editions of Twain, Dickens, Johnson, Byron, Andrew Carnegie, and Bram Stoker, as well as other rare books and prints.

Expansion
During and after the Depression years, the Academy acquired and merged with several other private schools, including the Livingston School, a highly regarded progressive elementary institution, the Dongan Hall-Arden School, which was located on the present day Todt Hill Campus, and the Willard-Mundorf School. In the 1940s, the Lower and Middle Schools of the Academy moved to Dongan Hall, a Georgian mansion that was formerly the estate of Edward Stettinius, FDR's and Truman's Secretary of State. The Upper School remained at the Wall Street campus.

The Academy maintained two campuses for many years. On December 10, 1964, ground was broken on the Todt Hill campus to build facilities to house the entire school. The Todt Hill campus additions included structures still in use today—the Early Childhood Building, Kearns Hall, and the O.J. Buck Gymnasium. Alumni Hall was completed in 1970, and the entire student body was accommodated on the Todt Hill campus shortly thereafter.

In September 1975, a fire destroyed Dongan Hall, the center of the Todt Hill campus. The building's structure was irreparably damaged, and most of the Winter Memorial Library portrait and book collections was lost. A single remnant from Dongan Hall, a pendulum clock, was saved. The clock now hangs in Crowe Hall, which was built in 1976 on the site of the historic Dongan Hall building.  Crowe Hall contains the Patrick Commons (the dining hall), the Head of School's office, and other administrative spaces. Haugen Hall, which houses the auditorium, the Stanley Library and arts classrooms, was also built in 1976.

In 1995, the Francis H. Powers Science and Technology Center was added to Kearns Hall. Campus facilities also include two outdoor swimming pools, tennis courts, athletic fields, and the Art Barn, which is the last remaining original structure on the campus and is used for students’ 3-D art classes.

21st century

The fall of 2002 marked a new chapter in the Academy's history with the  installation of Diane J. Hulse as the 15th Head of School. During the summer of 2003, the Stanley Library was completely renovated, the Patrick Commons dining hall was upgraded, new playground equipment was installed, and outdoor benches and tables were added. A school fitness center was opened in late 2003. In the summer of 2004, the school's athletics fields were upgraded. The Alexander Robbins Steinman Foundation partially funded the project in honor of Alex Steinman, Class of 1986, who died on 9/11. Other projects included the restoration of the Art Barn and the Haugen Hall entry steps, upgrades to classrooms, the art room, and computer labs.

In Spring 2018, the Renaissance Campaign was announced, which is a five-year development to drastically reshape the Academy. Over $6.02 million has currently been funded, with a stated goal of $10 million. Some of the funds will be used for financial aid for “qualified students”. As part of the campaign, Crowe Hall will be completely renovated and expanded, notably the addition of classrooms on the second floor and an overall area expansion of the first floor. Construction was hoped to begin in early 2019.

Heads of School
Anton Methfessel, 1862–1884
Frederick E. Partington, 1884–1907
Frank C. Page, 1907–1920
Dr. John F. Dunne, 1920–1925
Charles H. Garrison, 1925–29
Thomas Burton, 1929–1933
Charles L.S. Easton, 1933–1935
Stephen J. Botsford, 1935–1942
Dr. Harold E. Merrick, 1942–1962
Harvey H. MacArthur, 1962–1967
Dr. Mary E. Meade, 1967–1968
Peter M. Webster, 1968–1976
Dr. J. Stevens Bean, 1976–1989
F. Graham Brown Jr., 1989–1996
Carmen M. Marnell, 1996–2002
Diane J. Hulse I, 2002–2012
Albert R. Cauz, 2012–2022
Eileen Corigliano 2022-

Athletics
The Academy's mascot is the tiger, and its colors are maroon and gold. Athletic offerings include Cross Country, Baseball, Soccer, Tennis, Golf, Softball, Basketball, Volleyball and Lacrosse.

2006
The Varsity Golf team was undefeated (8-0), led by coaches Michael Shanley and Michael Acquilano. The team won the Independent Schools Athletic League (ISAL) regular season championship.

2007
The Varsity Golf team went undefeated (8-0) in the ISAL and was the regular season champion over Loyola School (New York City). The team also won the league tournament by seven strokes.

The Girls Varsity Lacrosse team had its first victory in many years in the Athletic Association of Independent Schools (AAIS) league, tying for first place among Manhattan schools such as Brearley and Chapin for a regular season victory. Another first for the lacrosse team was qualifying for the New York State Association of Independent Schools (NYSAIS) tournament.

The Boy's Varsity Tennis team reached a milestone as Coach Brian Manske reached 300 wins as a coach. The team also took back their firm hold on the Staten Island League as champions with a 9-0 record.

The Girls Varsity Tennis team were the regular season champions of their league for the first time in 5 years.

2008
The Girl's Varsity Basketball team went undefeated in the Athletic Conference of Independent Schools (ACIS) League, winning the season and playoff championships. However, the team was eliminated in the first round of the NYSAIS Tournament.

The Varsity Golf team won the ISAL tournament championship for the second year in a row by 14 strokes.

2009
The Boy's Varsity Tennis team went undefeated. This was the first time the tennis team has ever won the ACIS League.

The Boy's Varsity Soccer team won both the Private Schools Athletic Association (PSAA) and ACIS championships under the coaching of Bob Ramirez.

2013 
The Girl's Varsity Basketball team were the ACIS regular season champions, as well as the league's playoff champions. The team additionally championed the Lady Tigers Holiday Tournament and the Fieldston Tip-Off Tournament.

The Girl's Junior Varsity Basketball team were the PSAA regular season champions, as well as the league's playoff champions.

2014 
The Girl's Varsity Tennis team went undefeated in both the Catholic High School Athletic Association (CHSAA) and PSAA tennis leagues, winning the season and playoff championships.

The Girl's Varsity Basketball team championed the Lady Tigers Holiday Tournament and the Fieldston Tip-Off Tournament.

The Girl's Varsity Lacrosse team championed the AAIS league. The team also participated in the NYSAIS tournament.

2015 
The Boy's Varsity Volleyball team championed the PSAA regular season and playoffs.

The Girl's Varsity Basketball team championed the Lady Tigers Holiday Tournament and the Fieldston Tip-Off Tournament.

The Girl's Varsity Softball team were the PSAA regular season champions. The team additionally were the NYS Federation "B" champions.

Arts
In recent years, the Performing Arts Department has presented Upper School student productions of In The Heights in 2015, Rent in 2016, Anything Goes in 2017, and Rodger and Hammerstein’s Cinderella in 2018. Each year, the department presents two Upper School performances (one straight play and one musical), a Middle School play, and multiple Lower School grade plays. Annual concerts include performances by various student groups such as the orchestra and assorted singing groups.

Notable alumni
The Academy publicizes a "representative" list of "distinguished graduates". Among the alumni who achieved wider notability:
Chris Agoliati, professional US soccer player.
Oscar Auerbach, pathologist who helped prove that smoking causes lung cancer.
O.J. Buck, World War II fighter pilot who died over Nazi Germany in 1942, two years after he graduated. The Gymnasium is named after him.
Donald Davidson, Slusser Professor of Philosophy at the University of California, Berkeley.
John Peoples Jr., director of Fermilab from 1989–1999, director of the Sloan Digital Sky Survey from 1998–2003.
Joseph Rallo, Commissioner of Higher Education for Louisiana. 
Alan Seeger, poet and World War I hero (I Have a Rendezvous with Death); uncle of Pete Seeger.

External links
 Staten Island Academy official website

References

Preparatory schools in New York City
Private high schools in Staten Island
Private middle schools in Staten Island
Private elementary schools in Staten Island
Educational institutions established in 1884
1884 establishments in New York (state)
Todt Hill, Staten Island